Zoe Boyle (born 1 January 1989) is an English actress known for her roles as Lavinia Swire on the series Downton Abbey and Trinity Ashby on Sons of Anarchy.

Education 
Boyle attended the Royal Central School of Speech & Drama, at the University of London and graduated in 2006.

Career 
Boyle's breakthrough role was in Downton Abbey as Lavinia Swire. Boyle went on to land recurring roles in the television series Breathless, Frontier, and Witless.

Theatre

Filmography

Film

Television

References

External links 

 

1989 births
Living people
21st-century English actresses
Place of birth missing (living people)
Alumni of the Royal Central School of Speech and Drama